Damian Bellón (born 28 August 1989 in St. Gallen) is a former Swiss footballer and current football manager. He is the current coach of Thai League 3 club Young Singh Hatyai United. 

Bellón spent time in the academies of FC St. Gallen and English Premier League side Aston Villa, and appeared for the Switzerland U-21 as a youth player. In his professional career he played for a number of sides in his home country of Switzerland, Greece, and Thailand, before becoming a coach at Ranong United, MOF Customs United,  Phitsanulok and Samutsongkhram.

Career 

Damian moved on 11 July 2006 with his twin brother Yagó Bellón from FC St. Gallen to Aston Villa. On 7 July 2008, Bellón announced he was leaving Aston Villa to head to Liechtenstein to play for FC Vaduz of the Swiss Super League.

Damian moved in July 2012 to Veria, a Greek team currently playing in the Greek Super League where he made seven appearances. He could not settle himself so, during the winter transfer window, on 31 January 2013 Damian Bellon joined Panetolikos on a 1.5-year contract. Panaitolikos is currently part of the Greek Football League

On 25 January 2014 Bellon signed a 6-month contract going on loan to Aiginiakos.

Bellón later moved to Thailand to play professionally with spells at Saraburi, Chiangmai before becoming the first team coach at Ranong United in Thai League 3 in October 2018.

He was appointed on April 19, 2021 as head coach for MOF Customs United. after a successful first season on Thai League 2 with Ranong United.

Personal life 

Bellón has represented Switzerland at both Under 17 and Under 19 level. He is of Spanish descent and is the twin brother of retired football player Yagó Bellón. After retirement from football, Yagó commented how their father was incredibly strict and had made him and Damian train in isolation daily from a young age to achieve a professional contract, to the detriment of their school work and social life.

References

External links
FC Vaduz profile
football.ch profile
 Damian Bellón Interview

1989 births
Living people
Swiss men's footballers
Swiss Super League players
FC St. Gallen players
Grasshopper Club Zürich players
FC Vaduz players
Swiss expatriate footballers
Swiss expatriate sportspeople in Liechtenstein
Expatriate footballers in Liechtenstein
Swiss people of Spanish descent
Aston Villa F.C. players
Panetolikos F.C. players
Swiss expatriates in Liechtenstein
Swiss twins
Twin sportspeople
Sportspeople from St. Gallen (city)
Association football midfielders